The VL11  is an electric mainline DC freight and passenger locomotive, built in Georgia, used in Russia and Ukraine. The initials VL are those of Vladimir Lenin (ru: Владимир Ленин), after whom the class is named.

The ВЛ11 are built in two-section units, but can be built with three or four sections working with multi-tier technology. The three-section units have 12 axles, regenerative brakes and can haul loads up to 59,250 kg. They have an output of 8,040 kW.

The Ukrainian State Railway Administration (Ukrzaliznytsia) has upgraded their VL11 locomotives; starting in 2012, they plan to upgrade 20 a year. The upgrade will extend the operating life of each locomotive by 15 years, and it represents only 28% of the cost of a new electric locomotive.

See also
 The Museum of the Moscow Railway, at Paveletsky Rail Terminal, Moscow
 Rizhsky Rail Terminal, Home of the Moscow Railway Museum
 Varshavsky Rail Terminal, St.Petersburg, Home of the Central Museum of Railway Transport, Russian Federation
 History of rail transport in Russia

References

Railway locomotives introduced in 1975
Electric locomotives of Russia
Electric locomotives of the Soviet Union
3000 V DC locomotives
5 ft gauge locomotives
Bo′Bo′+Bo′Bo′ locomotives